Alice of Namur (died July 1169 at Valenciennes) was the daughter of Count Godfrey I of Namur and Countess Ermesinde of Luxembourg.

Her father married her off to Count Baldwin IV of Hainaut around 1130. Gislebert of Mons described her as having "a graceful body and a beautiful face". Their son Baldwin was the heir of Namur when her brother Count Henry IV of Luxembourg died in 1196.

Her children with Baldwin IV of Hainaut were:
Yolande (1131/5 – after 1202), wife of Count Ives II of Soissons, and Count Hugh IV of Saint Pol
Baldwin (1134 – 1147/50)
Agnes (1140/45 – 1174 or after), married Ralph de Coucy
Geoffrey, Count of Oostrevant (1147–1163), first husband of Countess Eleanor of Vermandois
Lauretta (died 1181), wife of Thierry of Alost (Dirk van Aalst) and Bouchard IV of Montmorency
Baldwin V, Count of Hainaut (1150–1195), later Count of Flanders by marriage to Margaret I of Flanders
Henry (died after 1207), Seigneur of Sebourg
Bertha

She was buried inside Saint Waltrude Collegiate Church.

References

Bibliography
 L. Devillers, Memoire historique et descriptif sur l'eglise de Sainte-Waudru a Mons, Mons, 1857.
 J.A. Everard, Brittany and the Angevins: Province and Empire, Cambridge, 2000, pp. 30-31.
 F. Rousseau, Henri l’Aveugle, Comte de Namur et de Luxembourg (1136-1196), Liège, 2013 (= Paris - Liège, 1921).

External links

Year of birth unknown
1169 deaths
House of Namur
Countesses of Hainaut
12th-century French women
12th-century French people